Scotland is an unincorporated community and census-designated place (CDP) in Taylor Township, Greene County, Indiana, United States. As of the 2010 census it had a population of 134.

History
The Scotland post office was established in 1837. A majority of the early settlers were natives of the country of Scotland.

The Scotland Hotel was listed on the National Register of Historic Places in 1993.

Geography
The southern border of the CDP follows the Martin and Daviess county lines. I-69 leads northeast  to Bloomington and southwest  to Washington.

It is situated on high ground to the south of Doans Creek, a west-flowing tributary of the White River and part of the Wabash River watershed.

Demographics

References

Census-designated places in Greene County, Indiana
Census-designated places in Indiana
Bloomington metropolitan area, Indiana